The Order of Central African Merit is the highest civil decoration of the Central African Republic. It was instituted on 20 June 1959, with the Grand Officer class being added on October 13, 1961.

It is awarded for special merit in the humanitarian, economic and social spheres.

Grades
It has five grades: Grand Cross, Grand Officer, Commander, Officer, and Knight. In addition, there is a Collar, which is the de facto presidential insignia.

References

Orders, decorations, and medals of the Central African Republic
Orders of merit
Awards established in 1959
1959 establishments in Africa